Cove Bay railway station served the suburb of Cove Bay, Aberdeen, Scotland from 1850 to 1956 on the Aberdeen Railway.

History 
The station opened as Cove on 1 April 1850 by the Aberdeen Railway.  The name was changed to Cove Bay on 1 October 1912. The station closed to passengers on 11 June 1956 and to goods on 28 October 1963.

Future 
In 2020 the north-east of Scotland transport body Nestrans secured £80,000 from the Local Rail Development Fund to explore the potential for additional stations between Aberdeen and Laurencekirk, including at Cove and Newtonhill.  Whilst a property developer has lodged proposals for 167 new homes close to where locals are calling for the new Cove railway station to be built, council officers have said there could still be space for a railway halt or station to be accommodated within the site.

References

External links 

Disused railway stations in Aberdeenshire
Former Caledonian Railway stations
Railway stations in Great Britain opened in 1850
Railway stations in Great Britain closed in 1956
1850 establishments in Scotland
1956 disestablishments in Scotland